United States service medals of the World Wars are U.S. military  medals which were created solely for recognizing service in the First World War and World War II.  Such medals are no longer awarded, but are still referred to in various publications, manuals, and award precedence charts as many veterans still display them as part of veteran functions and ceremonies.

The following service medals were awarded for service in the World Wars and for occupational duty following the end of each war.

Service medals

Victory medals

Service medals

Campaign medals

Occupation medals

service medals

World War I-related lists